The Brown Hills are a group of mainly snow-free hills in the Cook Mountains of Antarctica, lying north of the lower reaches of Darwin Glacier. They were named for their color by the Darwin Glacier Party of the Commonwealth Trans-Antarctic Expedition (1956–58).

See also
Gayson Ridge

References

 

Hills of Oates Land